The Metropolitanate of Merv was an East Syriac metropolitan province of the Church of the East, between the fifth and eleventh centuries, with several known suffragan dioceses.

Background 
At least one East Syriac diocese in Khorasan existed by the beginning of the fifth century, though it was not assigned to a metropolitan province in 410.  After establishing five metropolitan provinces in Mesopotamia, Canon XXI of the synod of Isaac provided that 'the bishops of the more remote dioceses of Fars, of the Islands, of Beth Madaye, of Beth Raziqaye and of the country of Abrashahr must accept the definition established in this council at a later date'.  By implication, Abrashahr (Nishapur) already had a bishop at this period.

Four East Syriac dioceses in Khorasan and Segestan are attested a few years later.  The bishops Bar Shaba of Merv, David of Abrashahr, Yazdoï of Herat and Aphrid of Segestan were present at the synod of Dadisho in 424.  The uncommon name of the bishop of Merv, Bar Shaba, means 'son of the deportation', suggesting that Merv's Christian community may have been deported from Roman territory.  

The diocese of Segestan, whose bishop probably sat at Zarang, was disputed during the schism of Narsaï and Elisha in the 520s.  The patriarch Aba I resolved the dispute in 544 by temporarily dividing the diocese, assigning Zarang, Farah and Qash to the bishop Yazdaphrid and Bist and Rukut to the bishop Sargis.  He ordered that the diocese should be reunited as soon as one of these bishops died.

The Christian population of the Merv region seems to have increased during the sixth century, as the bishop of Merv was recognised as a metropolitan at the synod of Joseph in 554 and Herat also became a metropolitan diocese shortly afterwards.  The first known metropolitan of Herat was present at the synod of Ishoyahb I in 585.  The growing importance of the Merv region for the Church of the East is also attested by the appearance of several more Christian centres during the late fifth and sixth century.  By the end of the fifth century the diocese of Abrashahr (Nishapur) also included the city of Tus, whose name featured in 497 in the title of the bishop Yohannis of 'Tus and Abrashahr'.  Four more dioceses seem also to have been created in the sixth century.  The bishops Yohannan of 'Abiward and Shahr Peroz' and Theodore of Merw-i Rud accepted the acts of the synod of Joseph in 554, the latter by letter, while the bishops Habib of Pusang and Gabriel of 'Badisi and Qadistan' adhered by proxy to the decisions of the synod of Ishoyahb I in 585, sending deacons to represent them.  None of these four dioceses is mentioned again, and it is not clear when they lapsed.

Timothy I consecrated a metropolitan named Hnanisho for Sarbaz in the 790s.  This diocese is not mentioned again.  In 893 Eliya of Damascus listed both Merv and Herat as metropolitan provinces.  Segestan was a suffragan diocese of Herat, while Merv had suffragan dioceses for 'Dair Hans', 'Damadut', and 'Dabar Sanaï', three districts whose locations are entirely unknown.  

By the eleventh century East Syriac Christianity was in decline in Khorasan and Segestan.  The last-known metropolitan of Merv was Abdisho, who was consecrated by the patriarch Mari (987–99).  The last-known metropolitan of Herat was Giwargis, who flourished in the reign of Sabrisho III (1064–72).  If any of the suffragan dioceses were still in existence at this period, they are not mentioned.  The surviving urban Christian communities in Khorasan suffered a heavy blow at the start of the thirteenth century, when the cities of Merv, Nishapur and Herat were stormed by Genghis Khan in 1220.  Their inhabitants were massacred, and although all three cities were refounded shortly afterwards, it is likely that they had only small East Syriac communities thereafter.  Nevertheless, at least one diocese survived into the thirteenth century.  In 1279 an unnamed bishop of Tus entertained the monks Bar Sawma and Marqos in the monastery of Mar Sehyon near Tus during their pilgrimage from China to Jerusalem.

The diocese of Merv 
The bishop Barshabba ('son of the deportation') of Merv was among the signatories of the acts of the synod of Dadisho in 424.

The bishop 'Pharumai', 'bishop of the town of Merv', was among the signatories of the acts of the synod of Acacius in 486.

The bishop Yohannan of Merv was among the signatories of the acts of the synod of Babaï in 497.

The bishop David, 'bishop, metropolitan of Merv', adhered by letter to the acts of the synod of Joseph in 554.

The priest Maraq was among the signatories of the acts of the synod of Ishoyahb I in 585, on behalf of the metropolitan Gregory of Merv.

The metropolitan Eliya of Merv was among the bishops present at the deathbed of the patriarch Ishoyahb III in 659.

The metropolitan Abdisho, formerly bishop of Ispahan, was appointed metropolitan of Merv by the patriarch Mari (987–99).  He was metropolitan of Merv when Elijah of Nisibis completed his Chronography in 1018/19.

The diocese of Herat 
The bishop Yazdoï of Herat was among the signatories of the acts of the synod of Dadisho in 424.

The bishop Yazdad of Herat adhered by letter to the acts of the synod of Babaï in 497.

The priest Daniel was among the signatories of the acts of the synod of Ishoyahb I in 585, on behalf of the metropolitan Gabriel of Herat.

The metropolitan Aristus of Herat was degraded during the patriarchate of Sliba-zkha (714–28) and replaced by Yohannan, who was himself degraded during the patriarchate of Pethion (731–40) and replaced by Panahisho.

The diocese of Segestan 
The bishop Aphrid of Segestan was among the signatories of the acts of the synod of Dadisho in 424.

In 540 the diocese of Segestan was disputed between two bishops, Yazdaphrid and Sargis, consecrated during the schism of Narsaï and Elisha.  The patriarch Mar Aba I, after taking evidence for both parties, resolved the dispute by temporarily dividing the diocese, placing Yazdaphrid in charge of 'the church of the Christians of Zarang, Farah and Qash' and Sargis over the churches of Bist and Rukut.  He insisted that the diocese should be reunited after the death of one or other bishop.

The bishop Kurmah of Segestan was among the signatories of the acts of the synod of Ezekiel in 576.

The patriarch Sabrisho III consecrated Giwargis of Kashkar a bishop shortly after his consecration in 1063/4 'and sent him to Khorasan and Segestan'.  Giwargis then 'travelled on to the territory of the Khitan (al-Khita), where he remained until the end of his life'.

The diocese of Tus and Abrashahr 
The bishop David of Abrashahr was among the signatories of the acts of the synod of Dadisho in 424.

The bishop Yohannis of Tus and Abrashahr was among the signatories of the acts of the synod of Babaï in 497.

An unnamed bishop of Tus entertained the monks Rabban Sawma and Marqos in the monastery of Mar Sehyon near Tus during their pilgrimage from China to Jerusalem in 1279.

The diocese of Merw i-Rud 
The bishop Theodore of Merw-i Rud adhered by letter to the acts of the synod of Joseph in 554.

The diocese of Abiward and Shahr Piroz 
The bishop Yohannan of 'Abiward and Shahr Piroz' was among the signatories of the acts of the synod of Joseph in 554.

The diocese of Pusang 
The deacon Elisha was among the signatories of the acts of the synod of Ishoyahb I in 585, on behalf of the bishop Habib of Pusang.

The diocese of Badisi and Qadistan 
The deacon Sargis was among the signatories of the acts of the synod of Ishoyahb I in 585, on behalf of the bishop Gabriel of Badisi and Qadistan.

References

Citations

Bibliography
 
 Assemani, J. S., Bibliotheca Orientalis Clementino-Vaticana (4 vols, Rome, 1719–28)
 
 Fiey, J. M., Assyrie chrétienne (3 vols, Beirut, 1962)
 Fiey, J. M.,  'Chrétientés syriaques du Khorasan et du Ségestan', Le Muséon, 86 (1973), 75–104
 
 
 Wallis Budge, E. A., The Book of Governors:  The Historia Monastica of Thomas, Bishop of Marga, AD 840 (London, 1893)
 Wallis Budge, E. A., The Monks of Kublai Khan (London, 1928)
 
 

Dioceses of the Church of the East
Dioceses of the Assyrian Church of the East
Assyrian geography
Christian organizations established in the 5th century
Eastern Christianity in Turkmenistan